John Whitfield (1752–1814) was a British stage actor.

He was part of the Covent Garden and Drury Lane companies, playing over two hundred roles. He often appeared alongside his wife Mary Whitfield.

Selected roles
 Agenor in Cleonice, Princess of Bithynia by John Hoole (1775)
 Edric in Percy by Hannah More (1777)
 Earl of Surrey in Alfred by John Home (1778)
 Don Garcia in A Bold Stroke for a Husband by Hannah Cowley (1783)
 Camillo in Julia by Robert Jephson (1787)
 Nicrates in The Fate of Sparta by Hannah Cowley (1788)
 De Courcy in The Haunted Tower by James Cobb (1789)
 Lupercio in Marcella by William Hayley (1789)
 Wortimerus in Vortigern and Rowena by William Henry Ireland (1796)
 Earling in False Impressions by Richard Cumberland (1797)
 Sir Henry Netterville in The Eccentric Lover by Richard Cumberland (1798)

References

Bibliography
 Cox, Jeffrey N. & Gamer, Michael. The Broadview Anthology of Romantic Drama. Broadview Press, 2003.
 Highfill, Philip H, Burnim, Kalman A. & Langhans, Edward A. A Biographical Dictionary of Actors, Actresses, Musicians, Dancers, Managers, and Other Stage Personnel in London, 1660-1800. SIU Press, 1973.
 Straub, Kristina, G. Anderson, Misty and O'Quinn, Daniel. The Routledge Anthology of Restoration and Eighteenth-Century Drama. Taylor & Francis,  2017.

18th-century English people
English male stage actors
British male stage actors
18th-century English male actors
18th-century British male actors
1752 births
1814 deaths